Beka Gotsiridze (born 21 February 1988 in Tbilisi, Georgian SSR, Soviet Union) is a footballer, currently playing for Merani Martvili.

He began his career at FC Zestafoni, in Georgia's Umaglesi Liga before in January 2009 joined to FC Dnipro Dnipropetrovsk.

In June 2009, he was involved in a car accident while driving to Tbilisi, Georgia from a nearby village. His spleen had to be removed due to his injuries.

References

External links

Footballers from Georgia (country)
Expatriate footballers from Georgia (country)
FC Ameri Tbilisi players
FC Zestafoni players
Georgia (country) international footballers
FC Dnipro players
FC Kryvbas Kryvyi Rih players
Ukrainian Premier League players
Expatriate footballers in Ukraine
Expatriate sportspeople from Georgia (country) in Ukraine
FC Dila Gori players
FC Sasco players
FC Merani Martvili players
Footballers from Tbilisi
1988 births
Living people
Association football forwards